Richmond Beetham (1832–1912) was a British-born painter and magistrate. He spent most of his life living in New Zealand.

Early life
Richmond Beetham was born in 1832 in Horncastle, England. He was the eldest son of Mary Beetham (née Brosley) and the portrait painter William Beetham. He attended the Elizabethan Foundation School. In the mid-1850s, he moved to Victoria, before moving to Wellington, New Zealand in 1859, where his parents had also moved.

Life in New Zealand
In 1862, he attained his first job as a public servant, working as a Receiver of Land Revenue in the Otago goldfields. In 1863 he married Lucelle Frances Swainson, the daughter of naturalist and artist William John Swainson. That same year, he was appointed as a stipendiary magistrate in Queenstown, and later Napier and Timaru. Eventually, he was moved to Christchurch in 1881, where he continued to work until his retirement in May 1903.

Artist
Like his father, Beetham was a painter. Throughout the 1880s and 1890s, he exhibited his works in New Zealand and abroad – including at the 1886 Colonial and Indian Exhibition in London, and the 1889–90 New Zealand and South Seas Exhibition in Dunedin. He also exhibited his works at the Canterbury Society of Arts from 1881 to 1893, where he also served on the committee and as President.

Later life
Beetham later moved to Masterton, where he died in 1912.

Art works
 The Roman Catholic Mission, Apia, Samoa in the collection of Alexander Turnbull Library

References

1832 births
1912 deaths
District Court of New Zealand judges
19th-century New Zealand painters
19th-century New Zealand male artists
English emigrants to New Zealand